Damon Fox may refer to:

 Damon Fox (writer), film writer and producer
 Damon Fox (musician), keyboardist and guitar player